Alexander Knox (16 January 1907 – 25 April 1995) was a Canadian actor on stage, screen, and occasionally television. He was nominated for an Oscar and won a Golden Globe for his performance as Woodrow Wilson in the film Wilson (1944).

Although his liberal views forced him to leave Hollywood because of McCarthyism, Knox had a long career. He starred in Tinker Tailor Soldier Spy (1979 BBC mini-series) as Control, Chief of the Circus and George Smiley's mentor. He was also an author, writing adventure novels set in the Great Lakes area during the 19th century as well as plays and detective novels.

Life and career
Knox was born in Strathroy, Ontario, where his father was the minister of the Presbyterian Church. He graduated from the University of Western Ontario. He moved to Boston, Massachusetts, to perform on stage with the Boston Repertory Theatre. After the company folded following the stock market crash of 1929, Knox returned to London, Ontario, where, for the next two years, he worked as a reporter for The London Advertiser before moving to London, England, where, during the 1930s, he appeared in several films. He starred opposite Jessica Tandy in the 1940 Broadway production of Jupiter Laughs and, in 1944, he was chosen by Darryl F. Zanuck to star in Wilson (1944), the biographical film about American President Woodrow Wilson, for which he won a Golden Globe Award and was nominated for the Academy Award for Best Actor. However, during the McCarthy Era, his liberal views and work with the Committee for the First Amendment hurt his career, but he was not blacklisted, and he returned to Britain.

Knox had major roles in The Sea Wolf (1941), None Shall Escape (1944), Over 21 (1945), Sister Kenny (1946), Man In The Saddle (1951), Paula (1952), Europa '51 (1952), and The Vikings (1958), as well as supporting roles late in his career, such as in The Damned (1963), Modesty Blaise (1966), Nicholas and Alexandra (1971), Joshua Then and Now (1985; his last film role) and the miniseries Tinker Tailor Soldier Spy.

He depicted Governor Hudson Inverest in "The Latin Touch", the second episode of the first season of The Saint in 1962.

He wrote six adventure novels: Bride of Quietness (1933), Night of the White Bear (1971), The Enemy I Kill (1972), Raider's Moon, The Kidnapped Surgeon and Totem Dream. He also wrote plays and at least three detective novels under a pseudonym before 1945.

Personal life
Knox was married to American actress Doris Nolan (1916–1998) from 1944 until his death in 1995. They starred together in the 1949 Broadway play The Closing Door, which Knox also wrote. They had a son Andrew Joseph Knox (born 1947; died by suicide in 1987) who became an actor and appeared in Doctor on the Go, and who was married to Imogen Hassall.

Knox died in Berwick-upon-Tweed from bone cancer on April 25, 1995.

Complete filmography

 The Ringer (1931) (uncredited)
 Rembrandt (1936) as Ludwick's Assistant (uncredited)
 The Tiger (1936 TV movie) as American Liaison Officer
 Everyman (1937 TV movie) as Everyman
 Polly (1937 TV movie) as Cawwawkee
 Deirdre (1938 TV movie) as Naisi
 The Gaunt Stranger (1938) as Dr. Lomond
 The Four Feathers (1939) (uncredited)
 Cheer Boys Cheer (1939) as Saunders 
 The Sea Wolf (1941) as Humphrey Van Weyden
 This Above All (1942) as Rector
 Commandos Strike at Dawn (1942) as German Captain
 None Shall Escape (1944) as Wilhelm Grimm
 Wilson (1944) as Woodrow Wilson
 Over 21 (1945) as Max W. Wharton
 Sister Kenny (1946) as Dr. McDonnell
 The Judge Steps Out (1948) as Judge Thomas Bailey
 The Sign of the Ram (1949) as Mallory St. Aubyn
 Tokyo Joe (1949) as Mark Landis
 I'd Climb the Highest Mountain (1951) as Tom Salter
 Two of a Kind (1951) as Vincent Mailer
 Saturday's Hero (1951) as Professor Megroth
 The Son of Dr. Jekyll (1951) as Dr. Curtis Lanyon
 Man in the Saddle (1951) as Will Isham
 Paula (1952) as Dr. Clifford Frazer
 Europa '51 (1952) as George Girard
 The Sleeping Tiger (1954) as Dr. Cilve Esmond
 The Divided Heart (1954) as The Chief Justice
 The Night My Number Came Up (1955) as Owen Robertson
 Alias John Preston (1955) as Dr. Peter Walton
 Reach for the Sky (1956) as Mr. Joyce
 High Tide at Noon (1957) as Stephen MacKenzie
 Hidden Fear (1957) as Hartman
 Davy (1958) as Sir Giles
 Chase a Crooked Shadow (1958) as Chandler Brisson
 The Vikings (1958) as Father Godwin
 Intent to Kill (1958) as Dr. McNeil
 Passionate Summer (1958) as Leonard Pawley
 The Two-Headed Spy (1958) as Gestapo Leader Müller
 Operation Amsterdam (1959) as Walter Keyser
 The Wreck of the Mary Deare (1959) as Petrie
 Oscar Wilde (1960) as Sir Edward Clarke
 Crack in the Mirror (1960) as President
 The Share Out (1962) as Col. Calderwood
 The Longest Day (1962) as Maj. Gen. Walter Bedell Smith
 The Damned (1963) as Bernard
 In the Cool of the Day (1963) as Frederick Bonner
 Man in the Middle (1964) as Col. Burton
 Woman of Straw (1964) as Detective Inspector
 Crack in the World (1965) as Sir Charles Eggerston
 Mister Moses (1965) as Rev. Anderson
 The Psychopath (1966) as Frank Saville
 Modesty Blaise (1966) as Minister
 Khartoum (1966) as Sir Evelyn Baring
 Accident (1967) as University Provost
 The 25th Hour (1967) as D.A.
 Bikini Paradise (1967) as Commissioner Lighton
 You Only Live Twice (1967) as American President (uncredited)
 How I Won the War (1967) as American General
 Villa Rides (1968) as President Madero
 Shalako (1968) as Henry Clarke
 Fräulein Doktor (1969) as Gen. Peronne
 Run a Crooked Mile (1969 TV movie) as Sir Howard Nettleton
 Skullduggery (1970) as Buffington
 When We Dead Awaken (1970 TV movie) as Rubek
 Puppet on a Chain (1971) as Colonel De Graaf
 Nicholas and Alexandra (1971) as The American Ambassador
 Truman at Potsdam (1976 TV movie) as Henry L. Stimson
 Holocaust 2000 (1977) as Meyer
 Churchill and the Generals (1979 TV movie) as Henry Stimson - Secretary of War
 Suez 1956 (1979 TV movie) as John Foster Dulles
 Tinker Tailor Soldier Spy (1979 TV mini-series) as Control - Chief of Circus
 Cry of the Innocent (1980 TV movie) as Thornton Donegin
 Gorky Park (1983) as General
 Helen Keller: The Miracle Continues (1984 TV movie) as Mr. Gilman
 The Last Place on Earth (1985 TV serial as Sir Clements Markham
 Joshua Then and Now (1985) as Senator Hornby

Selected stage roles
 Smoky Cell by Edgar Wallace (1930)
 Jupiter Laughs by A.J. Cronin (1944)
 Return to Tyassi by Benn Levy (1950)

References
Notes

External links

 
 

1907 births
1995 deaths
Best Drama Actor Golden Globe (film) winners
Canadian male stage actors
Canadian male film actors
Canadian male novelists
Canadian expatriate male actors in the United States
Canadian expatriate male actors in the United Kingdom

Hollywood blacklist
People from Strathroy-Caradoc
Deaths from bone cancer
Deaths from cancer in England
University of Western Ontario alumni
20th-century Canadian male actors
20th-century Canadian novelists
20th-century Canadian male writers